The Pacific Hotel Shanghai, also known as Shanghai Pacific Hotel and formerly the Hua Qiao Hotel, is a hotel located at 108 Nanjing West Road, across from People's Park, in Shanghai's Huangpu District, in China. According to its website, the hotel is operated by Shanghai Jin Jiang Group.

References

External links
 
 

Hotels in Shanghai
Huangpu District, Shanghai